Earle Elmer Meadows (June 29, 1913 – November 11, 1992) was an American pole vaulter who won a gold medal at the 1936 Olympics. His winning vault is featured in Leni Riefenstahl's film Olympia.

Meadows had a long rivalry with Bill Sefton, his teammate from the University of Southern California. They shared the AAU title in 1935 and the NCAA title in 1935 and 1936. In May 1937 they both set a  new world record at 4.48 m and then at 4.54 m. Meadows set two more world records (indoor) in 1941, winning three more times.. In 1948 he cleared 4.42 m, but later finished only sixth at the Olympic trials and thus was left out of the Olympic team. In retirement he ran a musical instrument business in Texas.  He was Inducted into the Texas Track and Field Coaches Hall of Fame, Class of 2016.

References

External links 

 

1913 births
1992 deaths
People from Corinth, Mississippi
American male pole vaulters
Athletes (track and field) at the 1936 Summer Olympics
Olympic gold medalists for the United States in track and field
USC Trojans men's track and field athletes
Track and field athletes from California
Medalists at the 1936 Summer Olympics